Zarechny is a rural locality (a settlement) in Verkhneikoretskoye Rural Settlement, Bobrovsky District, Voronezh Oblast, Russia. The population was 196 as of 2010.

References 

Rural localities in Bobrovsky District